Don Wee Boon Hong (born 1976) is a Singaporean politician and accountant. A member of the governing People's Action Party (PAP), he has been the Member of Parliament (MP) representing the Brickland division of Chua Chu Kang GRC since 2020.

Education
Wee attended Nan Hua High School and Ngee Ann Polytechnic. After completing his National Service, Wee completed a Bachelor of Accountancy degree as a part-time student. 

He subsequently went on to complete a Master of Business Administration degree at the Nanyang Technological University and a Master of Public Administration degree at the National University of Singapore's Lee Kuan Yew School of Public Policy. 

Wee had also taken an executive education programme at Harvard University's John F. Kennedy School of Government. 

He is a Chartered Accountant (Singapore), Fellow Certified Practising Accountant (CPA Australia) and ASEAN Chartered Professional Accountant. He also completed the Chartered Valuer and Appraiser Programme in 2018.

Career 
Wee joined a local bank as a non-executive staff after completing his full-time National Service as an officer in the Singapore Army's Armoured Regiment. In 2020, Wee was reportedly a senior vice president at United Overseas Bank. Wee is also a member of the Institute of Mental Health's visitors' board. Wee is also serving in Nan Hua High School's school advisory committee and doing pro bono work with the Office of the Public Guardian. Wee was elected into the Council of the Institute of Singapore Chartered Accountants in May 2019. Wee had worked at HSBC, OCBC Bank, Citibank and United Overseas Bank between 1998 and 2018.

Politics 
Wee was fielded in the 2020 general election to contest in Chua Chu Kang GRC on the People's Action Party's (PAP) ticket against the Progress Singapore Party. Wee's running mates were Gan Kim Yong, Low Yen Ling and Zhulkarnain Abdul Rahim. On 11 July 2020, Wee was declared an elected Member of Parliament representing Chua Chu Kang GRC in the 14th Parliament after the PAP team in Chua Chu Kang GRC garnered 58.64% of the valid votes.

References

External links
 Don Wee on Parliament of Singapore

1976 births
Ngee Ann Polytechnic alumni
Living people
People's Action Party politicians
Singaporean people of Chinese descent
Members of the Parliament of Singapore